Jahangirpur Govt. College, Naogaon is one of the oldest institutions of higher education in Bangladesh. Established in 1967 in Mohadevpur city. Jahangirpur Govt. College was the first Government institution in Mohadevpur. It offers three years bachelor and four years honours degree courses in various disciplines. The college is affiliated with the National University. Since 1967 it starts enrolling Higher Secondary students. Situated in the, Jahangirpur Govt. College is adjacent to the famous Mohadevpur Rajbari.

History
Jahangirpur Govt. College, Mohadevpur, Naogaon is a degree college affiliated with the National University. It was established in 1967. Jamidar Khitis Chandra Roy Chowdhury donated his vested property for this college. This college was founded by Md. Azizul Huq, ESQR, Sub divisional Officer, Naogaon, Rajshahi. The college gate was opened by A.M. Sayed, Deputy Commissioner, Rajshahi on 31 July 1967.

It was being nationalized on 9 January 1984. Its hostel was established in 1969. The first principal of this college was Md. Mostafizur Rahman and the present principal is S. M. Zillur Rahman.

Buildings

The main administrative building (shown in the picture), is a good example of British Indian colonial architecture. Other important older buildings of the colonial period include the Fuller Hostel Biology Building, Chemistry Building, Physics Building, former Muslim Hostel etc. Newer buildings include the Library and Auditorium, an Arts building, both dating from the 1950s and a new Science building, dating from the 1990s.

Jahangirpur Govt. College and the Language Movement

Immediately after the killing of students in Dhaka on 21 February 1952 students in Jahangirpur Govt. College built what is often thought to be the first (but short lived) martyr monument dedicated to the Language Movement. The present monument to the Language Movement dates from 1973. It was built to replace an earlier monument, built in 1969, that was destroyed by Pakistani forces in 1971.

Academic Calendar

External links
 

1967 establishments in East Pakistan
Colleges in Naogaon District
Universities and colleges in Naogaon District